Reykdæla saga ok Víga-Skútu or Reykdæla saga og Víga-Skútu is one of the sagas of Icelanders. The story takes place in the valley of Reykjadalur in northern Iceland in the second half of the 9th century. The saga consists of two parts. The first part principally features Áskel, father of Viga-Skuta;  the second part is about Víga-Skúta and his quarrels with his father-in-law Glúmr Eyjólfsson (Víga-Glúm) after Víga-Skúta marries  his daughter and then deserts her.

See also
Víga-Glúms saga

References

Related reading
Jónas Kristjánsson (1997) Eddas and Sagas: Iceland's Medieval Literature  (Reykjavik: Hið íslenska bókmenntafélag. Peter Foote, trans) 
Jesse Byock (1993) Feud in the Icelandic Saga (University of California Press)

External links
Proverbs in Reykdoela saga (ok Víga-Skutu)
Full text at the Icelandic Saga Database

Sagas of Icelanders